In recent years, 3D printing has developed significantly and can now perform crucial roles in many applications, with the most common applications being manufacturing, medicine, architecture, custom art and design, and can vary from fully functional to purely aesthetic applications. 

3D printing processes are finally catching up to their full potential, and are currently being used in manufacturing and medical industries, as well as by sociocultural sectors which facilitate 3D printing for commercial purposes. There has been a lot of hype in the last decade when referring to the possibilities we can achieve by adopting 3D printing as one of the main manufacturing technologies. Utilizing this technology would replace traditional methods that can be costly and time consuming. There have been case studies outlining how the customization abilities of 3D printing through modifiable files have been beneficial for cost and time effectiveness in a healthcare applications.

There are different types of 3D printing such as Fused filament fabrication (FFF), Stereolithography (SLA), Selective Laser Sintering (SLS), polyjet printing, Multi-Jet Fusion (MJF), Direct Metal Laser Sintering (DMLS), and Electron Beam Melting (EBM).

For a long time, the issue with 3D printing was that it has demanded very high entry costs, which does not allow profitable implementation to mass-manufacturers when compared to standard processes. However, recent market trends spotted have found that this is finally changing. As the market for 3D printing has shown some of the quickest growth within the manufacturing industry in recent years. The applications of 3D printing are vast due to the ability to print complex pieces with a use of a wide range of materials. Materials can range from plastic and polymers as thermoplastic filaments, to resins, and even stem cells.

Manufacturing applications 

AM technologies found applications starting in the 1980s in product development, data visualization, rapid prototyping, and specialized manufacturing. Their expansion into production (job production, mass production, and distributed manufacturing) has been under development in the decades since. Industrial production roles within the metalworking industries achieved significant scale for the first time in the early 2010s. Since the start of the 21st century there has been a large growth in the sales of AM machines, and their price has dropped substantially. According to Wohlers Associates, a consultancy, the market for 3D printers and services was worth $2.2 billion worldwide in 2012, up 29% from 2011. McKinsey predicts that additive manufacturing could have an economic impact of $550 billion annually by 2025. There are many applications for AM technologies, including architecture, construction (AEC), industrial design, automotive, aerospace, military, engineering, dental and medical industries, biotech (human tissue replacement), fashion, footwear, jewelry, eyewear, education, geographic information systems, food, and many other fields.

Additive manufacturing's earliest applications have been on the toolroom end of the manufacturing spectrum. For example, rapid prototyping was one of the earliest additive variants, and its mission was to reduce the lead time and cost of developing prototypes of new parts and devices, which was earlier only done with subtractive toolroom methods such as CNC milling and turning, and precision grinding, far more accurate than 3d printing with accuracy down to 0.00005" and creating better quality parts faster, but sometimes too expensive for low accuracy prototype parts. With technological advances in additive manufacturing, however, and the dissemination of those advances into the business world, additive methods are moving ever further into the production end of manufacturing in creative and sometimes unexpected ways. Parts that were formerly the sole province of subtractive methods can now in some cases be made more profitably via additive ones. In addition, new developments in RepRap technology allow the same device to perform both additive and subtractive manufacturing by swapping magnetic-mounted tool heads.

Cloud-based additive manufacturing 

Additive manufacturing in combination with cloud computing technologies allows decentralized and geographically independent distributed production. Cloud-based additive manufacturing refers to a service-oriented networked manufacturing model in which service consumers are able to build parts through Infrastructure-as-a-Service (IaaS), Platform-as-a-Service (PaaS), Hardware-as-a-Service (HaaS), and Software-as-a-Service (SaaS). Distributed manufacturing as such is carried out by some enterprises; there is also a services like 3D Hubs that put people needing 3D printing in contact with owners of printers.

Some companies offer online 3D printing services to both commercial and private customers, working from 3D designs uploaded to the company website. 3D-printed designs are either shipped to the customer or picked up from the service provider.

There are many open source websites that have downloadable STL files which are able to be modified or printed as is. Files ranging from functional tools to aesthetic figurines are available to the general public. Open source files can be beneficial for the user as the printed object can be more cost effective than commercial counterparts.

Mass customization 

Companies have created services where consumers can customize objects using simplified web based customization software, and order the resulting items as 3D printed unique objects. This now allows consumers to create custom cases for their mobile phones. Nokia has released the 3D designs for its case so that owners can customize their own case and have it 3D printed.

Rapid manufacturing 
Advances in RP technology have introduced materials that are appropriate for final manufacture, which has in turn introduced the possibility of directly manufacturing finished components. One advantage of 3D printing for rapid manufacturing lies in the relatively inexpensive production of small numbers of parts.

Rapid manufacturing is a new method of manufacturing and many of its processes remain unproven. 3D printing is now entering the field of rapid manufacturing and was identified as a "next level" technology by many experts in a 2009 report. One of the most promising processes looks to be the adaptation of selective laser sintering (SLS), or direct metal laser sintering (DMLS) some of the better-established rapid prototyping methods. , however, these techniques were still very much in their infancy, with many obstacles to be overcome before RM could be considered a realistic manufacturing method.

There have been patent lawsuits concerning 3-D printing for manufacturing.

Rapid prototyping 

Industrial 3D printers have existed since the early 1980s and have been used extensively for rapid prototyping and research purposes. These are generally larger machines that use proprietary powdered metals, casting media (e.g. sand), plastics, paper or cartridges, and are used for rapid prototyping by universities and commercial companies.

Research 
3D printing can be particularly useful in research labs due to its ability to make specialized, bespoke geometries. In 2012 a proof of principle project at the University of Glasgow, UK, showed that it is possible to use 3D printing techniques to assist in the production of chemical compounds. They first printed chemical reaction vessels, then used the printer to deposit reactants into them. They have produced new compounds to verify the validity of the process, but have not pursued anything with a particular application.

Usually, the FDM process is used to print hollow reaction vessels or microreactors. If the 3D print is performed within an inert gas atmosphere, the reaction vessels can be filled with highly reactive substances during the print. The 3D printed objects are air- and watertight for several weeks. By the print of reaction vessels in the geometry of common cuvettes or measurement tubes, routine analytical measurements such as UV/VIS-, IR- and NMR-spectroscopy can be performed directly in the 3D printed vessel.

In addition, 3D printing has been used in research labs as alternative method to manufacture components for use in experiments, such as magnetic shielding and vacuum components with demonstrated performance comparable to traditionally produced parts.

Food 

Additive manufacturing of food is being developed by squeezing out food, layer by layer, into three-dimensional objects. A large variety of foods are appropriate candidates, such as chocolate and candy, and flat foods such as crackers, pasta, and pizza. NASA has considered the versatility of the concept, awarding a contract to the Systems and Materials Research Consultancy to study the feasibility of printing food in space. NASA is also looking into the technology in order to create 3D printed food to limit food waste and to make food that are designed to fit an astronaut's dietary needs. A food-tech startup Novameat from Barcelona 3D-printed a steak from peas, rice, seaweed, and some other ingredients that were laid down criss-cross, imitating the intracellular proteins. One of the problems with food printing is the nature of the texture of a food. For example, foods that are not strong enough to be filed are not appropriate for 3D printing.

Agile tooling 
Agile tooling is the process of using modular means to design tooling that is produced by additive manufacturing or 3D printing methods to enable quick prototyping and responses to tooling and fixture needs. Agile tooling uses a cost-effective and high-quality method to quickly respond to customer and market needs. It can be used in hydro-forming, stamping, injection molding and other manufacturing processes.

Medical applications 
Surgical uses of 3D printing-centric therapies have a history beginning in the mid-1990s with anatomical modeling for bony reconstructive surgery planning. By practicing on a tactile model before surgery, surgeons were more prepared and patients received better care. Patient-matched implants were a natural extension of this work, leading to truly personalized implants that fit one unique individual. Virtual planning of surgery and guidance using 3D printed, personalized instruments have been applied to many areas of surgery including total joint replacement and craniomaxillofacial reconstruction with great success. Further study of the use of models for planning heart and solid organ surgery has led to increased use in these areas. Hospital-based 3D printing is now of great interest and many institutions are pursuing adding this specialty within individual radiology departments. The technology is being used to create unique, patient-matched devices for rare illnesses. One example of this is the bioresorbable trachial splint to treat newborns with tracheobronchomalacia developed at the University of Michigan. Several devices manufacturers have also begun using 3D printing for patient-matched surgical guides (polymers). The use of additive manufacturing for serialized production of orthopedic implants (metals) is also increasing due to the ability to efficiently create porous surface structures that facilitate osseointegration. Printed casts for broken bones can be custom-fitted and open, letting the wearer scratch any itches, wash and ventilate the damaged area. They can also be recycled.

Fused filament fabrication (FFF) has been used to create microstructures with a three-dimensional internal geometry. Sacrificial structures or additional support materials are not needed. Structure using polylactic acid (PLA) can have fully controllable porosity in the range 20%–60%. Such scaffolds could serve as biomedical templates for cell culturing, or biodegradable implants for tissue engineering. 

3D printing has been used to print patient-specific implant and device for medical use. Successful operations include a titanium pelvis implanted into a British patient, titanium lower jaw transplanted to a Dutch patient, and a plastic tracheal splint for an American infant. The hearing aid and dental industries are expected to be the biggest areas of future development using custom 3D printing technology. In March 2014, surgeons in Swansea used 3D printed parts to rebuild the face of a motorcyclist who had been seriously injured in a road accident. Research is also being conducted on methods to bio-print replacements for lost tissue due to arthritis and cancer .

3D printing technology can now be used to make exact replicas of organs. The printer uses images from patients' MRI or CT scan images as a template and lays down layers of rubber or plastic.

3D printing technology can also be used to produce personal protective equipment, also known as PPE, is worn by medical and laboratory professionals to protect themselves from infection when they are treating patients. Examples of PPE include face masks, face shields, connectors, gowns, and goggles. The most popular forms of 3D printed PPE are face masks, face shields, and connectors.

Nowadays, Additive Manufacturing is also employed in the field of pharmaceutical sciences. Different techniques of 3D printing (e.g. FDM, SLS, Inkjet Printing etc) are utilized according to their respective advantages and drawbacks for various applications regarding drug delivery.

Bio-printing 
In 2006, researchers at Cornell University published some of the pioneer work in 3D printing for tissue fabrication, successfully printing hydrogel bio-inks. The work at Cornell was expanded using specialized bioprinters produced by Seraph Robotics, Inc., a university spin-out, which helped to catalyze a global interest in biomedical 3D printing research.

3D printing has been considered as a method of implanting stem cells capable of generating new tissues and organs in living humans. With their ability to transform into any other kind of cell in the human body, stem cells offer huge potential in 3D bioprinting. Professor Leroy Cronin of Glasgow University proposed in a 2012 TED Talk that it was possible to use chemical inks to print medicine. In 2015 the FDA approved Spritam ®, a 3D printed drug also known as levetiracetam. Currently, there are three methods of 3D printing that have been explored for the production of drug making: laser based writing systems, printing-based inkjet systems, and nozzle based  systems.

, 3D bio-printing technology has been studied by biotechnology firms and academia for possible use in tissue engineering applications in which organs and body parts are built using inkjet techniques. In this process, layers of living cells are deposited onto a gel medium or sugar matrix and slowly built up to form three-dimensional structures including vascular systems. The first production system for 3D tissue printing was delivered in 2009, based on NovoGen bioprinting technology. Several terms have been used to refer to this field of research: organ printing, bio-printing, body part printing, and computer-aided tissue engineering, among others. The possibility of using 3D tissue printing to create soft tissue architectures for reconstructive surgery is also being explored.

In 2013, Chinese scientists began printing ears, livers and kidneys, with living tissue. Researchers in China have been able to successfully print human organs using specialized 3D bioprinters that use living cells instead of plastic . Researchers at Hangzhou Dianzi University designed the "3D bioprinter" dubbed the "Regenovo". Xu Mingen, Regenovo's developer, said that it can produce a miniature sample of liver tissue or ear cartilage in less than an hour, predicting that fully functional printed organs might take 10 to 20 years to develop.

Medical devices 

On October 24, 2014, a five-year-old girl born without fully formed fingers on her left hand became the first child in the UK to have a prosthetic hand made with 3D printing technology. Her hand was designed by US-based e-NABLE, an open source design organisation which uses a network of volunteers to design and make prosthetics mainly for children. The prosthetic hand was based on a plaster cast made by her parents. A boy named Alex was also born with a missing arm from just above the elbow. The team was able to use 3D printing to upload an e-NABLE Myoelectric arm that runs off of servos and batteries that are actuated by the electromyography muscle. With the use of 3D printers, e-NABLE has so far distributed thousands of plastic hands to children. Another example is Open Bionics, a company that makes fully functional bionic arms through 3D printing technology. 3D printing allows Open Bionics to create personalized designs for their clients, as there can be different colours, textures, patterns, and even "Hero Arms" that emulate superheroes like Ironman or characters from Star Wars.

Printed prosthetics have been used in rehabilitation of crippled animals. In 2013, a 3D printed foot let a crippled duckling walk again. 3D printed hermit crab shells let hermit crabs inhabit a new style home. A prosthetic beak was another tool developed by the use of 3D printing to help aid a bald eagle named Beauty, whose beak was severely mutilated from a shot in the face. Since 2014, commercially available titanium knee implants made with 3D printer for dogs have been used to restore the animals' mobility. Over 10,000 dogs in Europe and the United States have been treated after only one year.

In February 2015, FDA approved the marketing of a surgical bolt which facilitates less-invasive foot surgery and eliminates the need to drill through bone. The 3D printed titanium device, 'FastForward Bone Tether Plate' is approved to use in correction surgery to treat bunion. In October 2015, the group of Professor Andreas Herrmann at the University of Groningen has developed the first 3D printable resins with antimicrobial properties. Employing stereolithography, quaternary ammonium groups are incorporated into dental appliances that kill bacteria on contact. This type of material can be further applied in medical devices and implants.

3D Printing has been especially beneficial for the creation of patient specific prosthetics for large or invasive surgeries. In a case study published in 2020 about the benefits of 3D printing for hip prostheses, three patients with acetabular defects needed revisions of total hip arthroplasty (THA). 3D printing was utilized to produce prostheses that were specific to each of the three patients and their complex bone defect, which resulted in better post procedure recovery and prognosis of the individual.

In a case study about the applications of 3D printing in occupational therapy, the aspect of customization and quick fabrication at a low cost is utilized in different tools such as customized scissor handles and bottle openers for someone with hand motor complications. Beverage holders, writing guides, grip strengtheners, and other occupational therapy items were designed, printed, and compared with commercially available counterparts in a cost analysis. It found that the 3D printed items were on average 10.5 times more cost effective than commercial alternatives.

3D printing for medical devices can range from human prosthetics applications, to animal prostheses, to medical machine tools: On June 6, 2011, the company Xilloc Medical together with researchers at the University of Hasselt, in Belgium had successfully printed a new jawbone for an 83-year-old Dutch woman from the province of Limburg. 3D printing has been used to produce prosthetic beaks for eagles, a Brazilian goose named Victoria, and a Costa Rican toucan called Grecia. In March 2020, the Isinnova company in Italy printed 100 respirator valves in 24 hours for a hospital that lacked them in the midst of the coronavirus outbreak. It's clear that 3D printing technology is beneficial in many areas of healthcare.

Pharmaceutical Formulations 
In May 2015 the first formulation manufactured by 3D printing was produced. In August 2015 the FDA approved the first 3D printed tablet. Binder-jetting into a powder bed of the drug allows very porous tablets to be produced, which enables high drug doses in a single formulation that rapidly dissolves and is easily absorbed. This has been demonstrated for Spritam, a reformulation of levetiracetam for the treatment of epilepsy.

Additive Manufacturing has been increasingly utilized by scientists in the pharmaceutical field. However, after the first FDA approval of a 3D printed formulation, scientific interest for 3D applications in drug delivery grew even bigger. Research groups around the world are studying different ways of incorporating drugs within a 3D printed formulation, for example by incorporating poorly water-soluble drugs in self-emulsifying systems or emulsion gels. 3D printing technology allows scientists to develop formulations with a personalized approach, i.e. dosage forms tailored specifically to an individual patient. Moreover, according to the advantages of the diverse utilized techniques, formulations with various properties can be achieved. These may contain multiple drugs in a single dosage form, multi-compartmental designs, drug delivery systems with distinct release characteristics ,etc. During the earlier years, researchers have mainly focused on the Fused Deposition Modelling (FDM) technique. Nowadays, other printing techniques such as Selective Laser Sintering (SLS), Stereolithography (SLA) and Semi-solid extrusion (SSE) are also gaining traction and are being used for pharmaceutical applications.

Industrial applications

Apparel 

3D printing has entered the world of clothing with fashion designers experimenting with 3D-printed bikinis, shoes, and dresses. In commercial production Nike used 3D printing to prototype and manufacture the 2012 Vapor Laser Talon football shoe for players of American football, and New Balance is 3D manufacturing custom-fit shoes for athletes.

3D printing has come to the point where companies are printing consumer grade eyewear with on-demand custom fit and styling (although they cannot print the lenses). On-demand customization of glasses is possible with rapid prototyping.

However, comments have been made in academic circles as to the potential limitation of the human acceptance of such mass customized apparel items due to the potential reduction of brand value communication.

In the world of high fashion courtiers such as Karl Lagerfeld designing for Chanel, Iris van Herpen and Noa Raviv working with technology from Stratasys, have employed and featured 3d printing in their collections. Selections from their lines and other working with 3d printing were showcased at
the 2016 Metropolitan Museum of Art Anna Wintour Costume Center, exhibition "Manus X Machina".

During the COVID-19 pandemic, the Ukrainian-American undergraduate Karina Popovich founded Markers for COVID-19 which used 3D printing to create face shields, face masks and other items of personal protective equipment.

Industrial art and jewelry 
3D printing is used to manufacture moulds for making jewelry, and even the jewelry itself. 3D printing is becoming popular in the customisable gifts industry, with products such as personalized models of art and dolls, in many shapes: in metal or plastic, or as consumable art, such as 3D printed chocolate.

Automotive industry 

In early 2014, Swedish supercar manufacturer Koenigsegg announced the One:1, a supercar that utilizes many components that were 3D printed. In the limited run of vehicles Koenigsegg produces, the One:1 has side-mirror internals, air ducts, titanium exhaust components, and complete turbocharger assemblies that were 3D printed as part of the manufacturing process.

Urbee is the name of the first car in the world car mounted using the technology 3D printing (its bodywork and car windows were "printed"). Created in 2010 through the partnership between the US engineering group Kor Ecologic and the company Stratasys (manufacturer of printers Stratasys 3D), it is a hybrid vehicle with futuristic look.

In 2014, Local Motors debuted Strati, a functioning vehicle that was entirely 3D Printed using ABS plastic and carbon fiber, except the powertrain. In 2015, the company produced another iteration known as the LM3D Swim that was 80 percent 3D-printed. In 2016, the company has used 3D printing in the creation of automotive parts, such ones used in Olli, a self-driving vehicle developed by the company.

In May 2015 Airbus announced that its new Airbus A350 XWB included over 1000 components manufactured by 3D printing.

3D printing is also being utilized by air forces to print spare parts for planes. In 2015, a Royal Air Force Eurofighter Typhoon fighter jet flew with printed parts. The United States Air Force has begun to work with 3D printers, and the Israeli Air Force has also purchased a 3D printer to print spare parts.

Construction, home development 

The use of 3D printing to produce scale models within architecture and construction has steadily increased in popularity as the cost of 3D printers has reduced. This has enabled faster turn around of such scale models and allowed a steady increase in the speed of production and the complexity of the objects being produced.

Construction 3D printing, the application of 3D printing to fabricate construction components or entire buildings has been in development since the mid-1990s, development of new technologies has steadily gained pace since 2012 and the sub-sector of 3D printing is beginning to mature.

Firearms 

In 2012, the US-based group Defense Distributed disclosed plans to "design a working plastic gun that could be downloaded and reproduced by anybody with a 3D printer." Defense Distributed has also designed a 3D printable AR-15 type rifle lower receiver (capable of lasting more than 650 rounds) and a 30-round M16 magazine. The AR-15 has multiple receivers (both an upper and lower receiver), but the legally controlled part is the one that is serialized (the lower, in the AR-15's case). Soon after Defense Distributed succeeded in designing the first working blueprint to produce a plastic gun with a 3D printer in May 2013, the United States Department of State demanded that they remove the instructions from their website. After Defense Distributed released their plans, questions were raised regarding the effects that 3D printing and widespread consumer-level CNC machining may have on gun control effectiveness.

In 2014, a man from Japan became the first person in the world to be imprisoned for making 3D printed firearms. Yoshitomo Imura posted videos and blueprints of the gun online and was sentenced to jail for two years. Police found at least two guns in his household that were capable of firing bullets.

Computers and robots 

3D printing can also be used to make laptops and other computers and cases. For example, Novena and VIA OpenBook standard laptop cases. I.e. a Novena motherboard can be bought and be used in a printed VIA OpenBook case.

Open-source robots are built using 3D printers. Double Robotics grant access to their technology (an open SDK). On the other hand, 3&DBot is an Arduino 3D printer-robot with wheels and ODOI is a 3D printed humanoid robot.

Soft sensors and actuators 

3D printing has found its place in soft sensors and actuators manufacturing inspired by 4D printing concept. The majority of the conventional soft sensors and actuators are fabricated using multistep low yield processes entailing manual fabrication, post-processing/assembly, and lengthy iterations with less flexibility in customization and reproducibility of final products. 3D printing has been a game changer in these fields with introducing the custom geometrical, functional, and control properties to avoid the tedious and time-consuming aspects of the earlier fabrication processes.

Space 

The Zero-G Printer, the first 3D printer designed to operate in zero gravity, was built under a joint partnership between NASA Marshall Space Flight Center (MSFC) and Made In Space, Inc. In September 2014, SpaceX delivered the zero-gravity 3D printer to the International Space Station (ISS). On December 19, 2014, NASA emailed CAD drawings for a socket wrench to astronauts aboard the ISS, who then printed the tool using its 3D printer. Applications for space offer the ability to print parts or tools on-site, as opposed to using rockets to bring along pre-manufactured items for space missions to human colonies on the moon, Mars, or elsewhere. The second 3D printer in space, the European Space Agency's Portable On-Board 3D Printer (POP3D) was planned to be delivered to the International Space Station before June 2015. By 2019, a commercial-built recycling facility was scheduled to be sent to the International Space Station to take in plastic waste and unneeded plastic parts and convert them into spools of feedstock for the space station additive manufacturing facility to be used to build manufactured-in-space parts.

In 2016, Digital Trends reported that BeeHex was building a 3D food printer for crewed missions to Mars.

Most construction planned on asteroids or planets will be bootstrapped somehow using the materials available on those objects. 3D printing is often one of the steps in this bootstrapping. The Sinterhab project is researching a lunar base constructed by 3D printing using lunar regolith as a base material. Instead of adding a binding agent to the regolith, researchers are experimenting with microwave sintering to create solid blocks from the raw material.

Projects like these have been investigated for construction of off-Earth habitats.

Sociocultural applications 

In 2005, a rapidly expanding hobbyist and home-use market was established with the inauguration of the open-source RepRap and Fab@Home projects. Virtually all home-use 3D printers released to-date have their technical roots in the ongoing RepRap Project and associated open-source software initiatives. In distributed manufacturing, one study has found that 3D printing could become a mass market product enabling consumers to save money associated with purchasing common household objects. For example, instead of going to a store to buy an object made in a factory by injection molding (such as a measuring cup or a funnel), a person might instead print it at home from a downloaded 3D model.

Art and jewellery 
In 2005, academic journals began to report on the possible artistic applications of 3D printing technology, being used by artists such as Martin John Callanan at The Bartlett school of architecture. By 2007 the mass media followed with an article in the Wall Street Journal and Time magazine, listing a printed design among their 100 most influential designs of the year. During the 2011 London Design Festival, an installation, curated by Murray Moss and focused on 3D Printing, was held in the Victoria and Albert Museum (the V&A). The installation was called Industrial Revolution 2.0: How the Material World will Newly Materialize.

At the 3DPrintshow in London, which took place in November 2013 and 2014, the art sections had works made with 3D printed plastic and metal. Several artists such as Joshua Harker, Davide Prete, Sophie Kahn, Helena Lukasova, Foteini Setaki showed how 3D printing can modify aesthetic and art processes. In 2015, engineers and designers at MIT's Mediated Matter Group and Glass Lab created an additive 3D printer that prints with glass, called G3DP. The results can be structural as well as artistic. Transparent glass vessels printed on it are part of some museum collections.

The use of 3D scanning technologies allows the replication of real objects without the use of moulding techniques that in many cases can be more expensive, more difficult, or too invasive to be performed, particularly for precious artwork or delicate cultural heritage artifacts where direct contact with the moulding substances could harm the original object's surface.

3D selfies 

A 3D photo booth such as the Fantasitron located at Madurodam, the miniature park, generates 3D selfie models from 2D pictures of customers. These selfies are often printed by dedicated 3D printing companies such as Shapeways. These models are also known as 3D portraits, 3D figurines or mini-me figurines.

Communication 
Employing additive layer technology offered by 3D printing, Terahertz devices which act as waveguides, couplers and bends have been created. The complex shape of these devices could not be achieved using conventional fabrication techniques. Commercially available professional grade printer EDEN 260V was used to create structures with minimum feature size of 100 µm. The printed structures were later DC sputter coated with gold (or any other metal) to create a Terahertz Plasmonic Device.
In 2016 artist/scientist Janine Carr Created the first 3d printed vocal percussion (beatbox) as a waveform, with the ability to play the soundwave by laser, along with four vocalised emotions these were also playable by laser.

Domestic use 
Some early consumer examples of 3d printing include the 64DD released in 1999 in Japan. As of 2012, domestic 3D printing was mainly practiced by hobbyists and enthusiasts. However, little was used for practical household applications, for example, ornamental objects. Some practical examples include a working clock and gears printed for home woodworking machines among other purposes. Web sites associated with home 3D printing tended to include backscratchers, coat hooks, door knobs, etc.

The open source Fab@Home project has developed printers for general use. They have been used in research environments to produce chemical compounds with 3D printing technology, including new ones, initially without immediate application as proof of principle. The printer can print with anything that can be dispensed from a syringe as liquid or paste. The developers of the chemical application envisage both industrial and domestic use for this technology, including enabling users in remote locations to be able to produce their own medicine or household chemicals.

3D printing is now working its way into households, and more and more children are being introduced to the concept of 3D printing at earlier ages. The prospects of 3D printing are growing, and as more people have access to this new innovation, new uses in households will emerge.

The OpenReflex SLR film camera was developed for 3D printing as an open-source student project.

Education and research 

3D printing, and open source 3D printers in particular, are the latest technology making inroads into the classroom. 3D printing allows students to create prototypes of items without the use of expensive tooling required in subtractive methods. Students design and produce actual models they can hold. The classroom environment allows students to learn and employ new applications for 3D printing. RepRaps, for example, have already been used for an educational mobile robotics platform.

Some authors have claimed that 3D printers offer an unprecedented "revolution" in STEM education. The evidence for such claims comes from both the low cost ability for rapid prototyping in the classroom by students, but also the fabrication of low-cost high-quality scientific equipment from open hardware designs forming open-source labs. Engineering and design principles are explored as well as architectural planning. Students recreate duplicates of museum items such as fossils and historical artifacts for study in the classroom without possibly damaging sensitive collections. Other students interested in graphic designing can construct models with complex working parts easily. 3D printing gives students a new perspective with topographic maps. Science students can study cross-sections of internal organs of the human body and other biological specimens. And chemistry students can explore 3D models of molecules and the relationship within chemical compounds. The true representation of exactly scaled bond length and bond angles in 3D printed molecular models can be used in organic chemistry lecture courses to explain molecular geometry and reactivity.

According to a recent paper by Kostakis et al., 3D printing and design can electrify various literacies and creative capacities of children in accordance with the spirit of the interconnected, information-based world.

Future applications for 3D printing might include creating open-source scientific equipment.

Nowadays, the demand of 3D printing keep on increasing in order to fulfill the demands in producing parts with complex geometry at a lower development cost. The increasing demands 3D printing parts in industry would eventually lead to the 3D printed parts repairing activity and secondary process such as joining, foaming and cutting. This secondary process need to be developed in order to support the growth of the 3D printing application in the future. From the research, FSW is proven able to be used as one of the methods to join the metal 3D printing materials. By using proper FSW tools and correct parameter setting a sound and defect-free weld can be produced in order to join the metal 3D printing materials.

Environmental use 
In Bahrain, large-scale 3D printing using a sandstone-like material has been used to create unique coral-shaped structures, which encourage coral polyps to colonize and regenerate damaged reefs. These structures have a much more natural shape than other structures used to create artificial reefs, and, unlike concrete, are neither acid nor alkaline with neutral pH.

Cultural heritage 

In the last several years 3D printing has been intensively used by in the cultural heritage field for preservation, restoration and dissemination purposes. Many Europeans and North American Museums have purchased 3D printers and actively recreate missing pieces of their relics.

Scan the World is the largest archive of 3D printable objects of cultural significance from across the globe. Each object, originating from 3D scan data provided by their community, is optimised for 3D printing and free to download on MyMiniFactory. Through working alongside museums, such as The Victoria and Albert Museum and private collectors, the initiative serves as a platform for democratizing the art object.

The Metropolitan Museum of Art and the British Museum have started using their 3D printers to create museum souvenirs that are available in the museum shops. Other museums, like the National Museum of Military History and Varna Historical Museum, have gone further and sell through the online platform Threeding digital models of their artifacts, created using Artec 3D scanners, in 3D printing friendly file format, which everyone can 3D print at home.

Specialty materials 
Consumer grade 3D printing has resulted in new materials that have been developed specifically for 3D printers. For example, filament materials have been developed to imitate wood in its appearance as well as its texture. Furthermore, new technologies, such as infusing carbon fiber into printable plastics, allowing for a stronger, lighter material. In addition to new structural materials that have been developed due to 3D printing, new technologies have allowed for patterns to be applied directly to 3D printed parts. Iron oxide-free Portland cement powder has been used to create architectural structures up to 9 feet in height.

See also
 3D printing processes
 3D printing
 Construction 3D printing

References

Sources
 

3D printing
Industrial design
Emerging technologies
Industrial processes